Exilisia butleri is a moth of the subfamily Arctiinae. It was described by Hervé de Toulgoët in 1958. It is found on Madagascar.

References

 

Lithosiini
Moths described in 1958